Streptomyces achromogenes is a species of gram-positive bacterium that belongs in the genus Streptomyces. S. achromogenes can be grown at 28 °C in a medium of yeast and malt extract with glucose.

Streptomyces achromogenes is the source of the restriction enzymes SacI and SacII, as well as the antibiotic compound sarcidin. A strain of the bacterium called S. achromogenes var. streptozoticus was the original source of the pancreatic cancer drug streptozotocin.

References

External links
Type strain of Streptomyces achromogenes at BacDive -  the Bacterial Diversity Metadatabase

achromogenes
Bacteria described in 1953